Dolomena plicata, common name the pigeon conch, is a species of medium-sized to large sea snail, a marine gastropod mollusk in the family Strombidae, the true conchs.

Subspecies
 Dolomena plicata sibbaldi (G. B. Sowerby II, 1842) (synonyms: Dolomena sibbaldi (G. B. Sowerby II, 1842); Strombus kieneri Issel & Tapparone Canefri, 1876; Strombus sibbaldi G. B. Sowerby II, 1842 (original combination) )
 Dolomena plicata yerburyi (E. A. Smith, 1891) (synonym: Strombus yerburyi E. A. Smith, 1891 )

Description
The shell size varies between 45 mm and 77 mm.

Distribution
This species occurs in the Red Sea and in the Indian Ocean off East Africa.

References

 Walls, J.G. (1980). Conchs, tibias and harps. A survey of the molluscan families Strombidae and Harpidae. T.F.H. Publications Ltd, Hong Kong
 Liverani V. (2014) The superfamily Stromboidea. Addenda and corrigenda. In: G.T. Poppe, K. Groh & C. Renker (eds), A conchological iconography. pp. 1-54, pls 131-164. Harxheim: Conchbooks.

External links
 
 Griffith, E. & Pidgeon, E. (1833-1834). The Mollusca and Radiata. Vol. 12, In: E. Griffith, [1824−1835, The Animal Kingdom arranged in conformity with its organization, by the Baron Cuvier, [...]. London: Whittaker and Co., viii + 601 pp., 61 pls. 1−138]

Strombidae
Gastropods described in 1798